The Otranto Barrage was an Allied naval blockade of the Otranto Straits between Brindisi in Italy and Corfu on the Greek side of the Adriatic Sea in the First World War. The blockade was intended to prevent the Austro-Hungarian Navy from escaping into the Mediterranean and threatening Allied operations there. The blockade was effective in preventing surface ships from escaping the Adriatic, but it had little or no effect on the submarines based at Cattaro.

Blockade attempt

The blockade consisted mainly of a fleet of drifters, most of them British, and usually armed with a 6-pounder gun and depth charges. In 1915 when the blockade was begun, two divisions of 20 would be on patrol at a time, equipped with steel indicator nets intended to trap submarines or at least alert the surface vessels to their presence. A third division would be at Brindisi. The drifters were supported by destroyers and aircraft. However, the demands of the Gallipoli Campaign and other naval operations left the Otranto Barrage with insufficient resources to deter the U-boats, and only the Austro-Hungarian  was caught by the indicator nets during the course of the war. It was later considered that the straits had simply been too wide to be netted, mined or patrolled effectively.

The ease with which German and Austrian submarines continued out of the Austro-Hungarian ports in spite of the barrage (and the success they had in disrupting shipping in the whole of the Mediterranean) strongly embarrassed the Allies, the system being called "a large sieve through which U-boats could pass with impunity". In 1917–1918, reinforcements from the Australian and American navies brought the blockading force up to 35 destroyers, 52 drifters and more than 100 other vessels. Nevertheless, submarines continued to slip through until the end of the war; the introduction of the convoy system and better coordination amongst the Allies only helped to cut the losses they were causing.

Raids and battles

The Austrians mounted nighttime raids against the barrage, five in 1915, nine in 1916 and ten in 1917. After a raid by four s in December 1916, a conference in London concluded that the drifters were insufficiently defended. The barrage was placed under the command of a single British officer, Commodore Algernon Walker-Heneage-Vivian, who was able to call upon all Allied ships not in use elsewhere. The fleet, commanded by Commodore Miklós Horthy, sank 14 drifters out of 47 on duty, and damaged a further three seriously.

Skipper Joseph Watt was later awarded the Victoria Cross for defending his drifter Gowanlea under heavy attack from Novara. The British light cruisers  and —together with Italian and French destroyers, under command of Italian Rear Admiral Alfredo Acton—steamed from Brindisi to engage the Austrians, resulting in the Battle of the Otranto Straits. The British damaged Saida and disabled Novara, severely injuring Horthy. However, the British cruisers broke off the engagement when the Italian flag officer received notice of heavy Austrian forces coming out of Cattaro. Saida towed Novara back to port. Dartmouth was damaged by UC-25 as it returned to Brindisi. The night before, the same U-boat had laid a minefield at the mouth of Brindisi harbour; the  struck one of these mines exiting the harbour the very same day and exploded, sinking with all hands.

In June 1918, Horthy—by now commander-in-chief of the Austro-Hungarian Navy—decided to launch an attack on the barrage employing the four s based at Pola, the most modern in the fleet. While en route down the Adriatic, the battleship  was torpedoed and sunk by an Italian torpedo boat at dawn on 10 June, resulting in the attack being cancelled.

Notes

References
 Millholland, Ray, "The Splinter Fleet of Otranto Barrage" The Readers League of America, New York, NY, 1936

Further reading
 Halpern, Paul, The Battle of the Otranto Straits: Controlling the Gateway to the Adriatic in World War I. Bloomington, IN: Indiana University Press, 2004. . A comprehensive account of the battle.
 (IT) Carlo Stasi, Otranto e l'Inghilterra (episodi bellici in Puglia e nel Salento), in "Note di Storia e Cultura Salentina", anno XV, (Argo, Lecce 2003)
 (IT) Carlo Stasi, Otranto nel Mondo. Dal "Castello" di Walpole al "Barone" di Voltaire (Editrice Salentina, Galatina 2018)

External links

 Austro-Hungarian Raids on the Otranto Barrage
 Otranto Barrage article from firstworldwar.com

Otranto Straits
Otranto Straits
Otranto Straits
Otranto Straits
Otranto Straits
Otranto Straits
History of the Adriatic Sea
Otranto